C8orf48 is a protein that in humans is encoded by the C8orf48 gene. C8orf48 is a nuclear protein specifically predicted to be located in the nuclear lamina.  C8orf48 has been found to interact with proteins that are involved in the regulation of various cellular responses like gene expression, protein secretion, cell proliferation, and inflammatory responses. This protein has been linked to breast cancer and papillary thyroid carcinoma.

Gene 
C8orf48 is located on chromosome 8 (8p22) and spans from 13,566,843 to 13,568,288 on the positive strand. C8orf48 has an exon count of 1 and no introns. This protein does not have any isoforms nor exhibit any alternative splicing.

Protein 
The protein C8orf48 is 319 amino acids in length. The molecular weight of this protein is 36.9 kDa and the isoelectric point is 8.86. The C8orf48 protein is predicted to be a nuclear protein particularly located in the nuclear lamina. This protein does not possess any signal peptides or transmembrane domains. This protein has also been found to be fairly abundant in humans.

Structure 

C8orf48 protein has two predicted nuclear localization signals one spanning from 135-149 amino acids and the other from 204-221. The secondary structure of C8orf48 protein is composed of primarily alpha-helices and coiled coils. The structure is composed of very little beta sheets, a total of three areas demonstrate possible beta sheet structure.

The Tertiary structure of C8orf48 was obtained from the iTASSER program.

Post-translational modifications 
C8orf48 has various predicted post-translational modifications. These post-translational modifications include O-glycosylation, Glycation, N-linked glycosylation, Phosphorylation Sites, Yin-Yang sites, sumoylation, and SUMO interactions.

Subcellular localization 
PSORT II results determined that the protein C8orf48 does not have a signalPeptide as well as no transmembrane domains. The prediction is that C8orf48 is most likely nuclear and potentially cytoplasmic. When comparing orthologs of C8orf48 we see very similar results, the protein is predicted to be localized in the nucleus predominantly and secondly predicted to be localized in the cytoplasm. Further sub-cellular localization analysis was done through the use of CELLO. These results also support the notion that C8orf48 is localized in the nucleus.

Homology 
C8orf48 is conserved in mammals, amphibians, reptiles, aves, and fish. C8orf48 orthologs were unable to be found in bacteria, archea, plants, and fungi. There were no human paralogs found of C8orf48. Certain portions of the DUF 4606 domain is highly conserved in the orthologs.

Expression 
This gene has been found to be overly expressed in the tissues of the testis and colon muscle, as well as expressed in 76 developmental stages. C8orf48 has been found to be expressed most often in the bladder, bone, heart, larynx, testis, and thyroid. In regards to the developmental stages, C8orf48 was most often found in the embroid body.

GEO profiles 

In a study regarding multiple myeloma bone marrow mesenchymal stromal cells shows that the expression of C8orf48 is lower in the disease state cells in comparison to healthy cells.  the opposite is demonstrated in the GeoProfile regarding Endometriosis, in this study, it was found that C8orf48 levels are higher in the disease state than in the healthy state. Other studies demonstrate differential expression of Papillary Thyroid cancer and Estrogen Receptor alpha-silenced MCF7 breast cancer cells. In control samples the levels of C8orf48 were lower than that of those with the Estrogen receptor knockdown.

Regulation of expression 

The transcription factors that act on C8orf48 are presented in Table 1. The majority of the transcription factors are involved in cell growth, proliferation, or regulation of cell migration. This implies that C8orf48 may play a role in the cell cycle. A few of the transcription factors presented themselves more than once, on both the positive and negative strand. These transcription factors include MAX binding protein and Estrogen-related receptor alpha (secondary DNA binding preference) both of which are involved in cell growth.

Protein interactions 
The proteins that interact with C8orf48 include Deleted In Liver Cancer 1 Protein (DLC1), MyoD Family Inhibitor (MDFI), Zinc Finger Protein 14 (ZNF14), and Sacroglycan Zeta (SGCZ). All of these protein interactions were found experimentally via a two-hybrid pooling approach, two-hybrid array, or two-hybrid screen.

Clinical significance 
C8orf48 has been found in studies regarding various types of carcinoma. Different C8orf48 expression levels have been found in Papillary Thyroid cancer and Estrogen Receptor alpha-silenced MCF7 breast cancer cells.

References 

Human proteins